is a passenger railway station in the town of Yorii, Saitama, Japan, operated by the private railway operator Chichibu Railway.

Lines

Station layout
The station is staffed and consists of a single island platform serving two tracks.

Platforms

Adjacent stations

History
Sakurazawa Station opened on 1 April 1989.

Passenger statistics
In fiscal 2018, the station was used by an average of 918 passengers daily.

Surrounding area
 
 
 Saitama Prefectural Yorii Jōhoku High School
 Yorii Junior High School
 Sakurazawa Elementary School

See also
 List of railway stations in Japan

References

External links

 Sakurazawa Station information (Saitama Prefectural Government) 
 Sakurazawa Station timetable 

Railway stations in Saitama Prefecture
Railway stations in Japan opened in 1989
Yorii, Saitama